From Hell is a graphic novel by writer Alan Moore and artist Eddie Campbell, about Jack the Ripper and the Whitechapel murders

From Hell may also refer to:

 From Hell (film), a 2001 American/British film, loosely based on the comic book series 
 From Hell letter, the original letter, purported from Jack the Ripper
 From Hell (EP), a 2006 EP by Walls of Jericho
 ...from Hell, a British TV documentary series, about various events.
 From Hell, the first episode of the third series of the British comedy series The IT Crowd

See also

 Whitechapel murders, associated with Jack the Ripper
 Jack the Ripper, from the Whitechapel murders
 
 From (disambiguation)
 Hell (disambiguation)